Jesse is the surname of:

 Eckhard Jesse (born 1948), German political scientist
 Edward Jesse (1780–1868), English writer on natural history
 John Heneage Jesse (1809–1874), English historian
 John John Jesse (born 1969), American painter
 Richard Henry Jesse (1853–1921), American educator, president of the University of Missouri
 F. Tennyson Jesse (1888–1958), English criminologist, journalist and author

See also
Jessye, given name and surname